Compsoctena africanella is a moth in the Eriocottidae family. It was described by Strand in 1909. It is found in Botswana, Malawi, Mozambique, South Africa, Tanzania and Zambia.

References

Moths described in 1909
Compsoctena
Moths of Africa